South Carolina Highway 4 (SC 4) is a primary  state highway in the southern part of the U.S. state of South Carolina. The highway connects Aiken and Orangeburg, via Springfield and Neeses.

Route description
SC 4 begins at an intersection with U.S. Route 78 (US 78; Charleston Highway) southeast of Aiken. The route travels to the east-northeast and intersects US 78 Truck/SC 118/SC 302 (Rudy Mason Parkway). SC 4 and SC 302 form an approximately  concurrency. They curve to the northeast and cross Shaw Creek. They curve to the east-southeast and curve back to the northeast before crossing the South Fork Edisto River and Cedar Creek. The two highways curve to the southeast and split north of Aiken State Park. SC 4 crosses over Burcalo Creek and then intersects SC 394 (Salley Road). It curves to the east-southeast and passes north of the Aiken Gopher Tortoise Heritage Preserve/Wildlife Management Area. It curves to the east-northeast and enters Orangeburg County.

SC 4 curves to the east-southeast and crosses Dean Swamp Creek. It curves to the southeast and enters Springfield. Right after entering the city limits, it curves to the south-southeast. It turns left onto SC 39 (Springfield Road). The two highways travel concurrently to the northeast for one block. One more block after that, it begins a concurrency with SC 3 Business. (SC 3 Bus.) They split three blocks later, with SC 4 heading south-southeast. It curves to the east-southeast and leaves Springfield. The highway immediately intersects SC 3 (Capital Way). It heads to the east and crosses Goodland Creek. It begins curving to the northeast and intersects SC 332 (Norway Road). The highway passes Rocky Swamp Cemetery and crosses Rocky Swamp Creek. It curves to the east-southeast and crosses Bolen Mill Creek before heading back to the northeast. It begins to curve to the east-southeast and enters Neeses. In Neeses, the route intersects US 321 (Savannah Highway). It heads east and passes Hickory Hill Cemetery, Pine Hill Cemetery, and Double Branch Cemetery before curving to the east-southeast. The highway crosses over Great Branch and curves to the southeast. Then, it crosses over Fourmile Creek and intersects the eastern terminus of SC 400 (Norway Road). SC 4 enters Edisto and curves to the east-southeast. It intersects US 301/US 601. The three highway travel concurrently to the east-northeast. They cross over the North Fork Edisto River, where they leave Edisto and enter Orangeburg. Immediately, they intersect the southern terminus of SC 33 (Russell Street). The concurrency intersects US 601 Truck. Here, SC 4 travels to the south-southeast, concurrent with US 601 Truck. They cross over some railroad tracks and pass by Southern Methodist College. The road curves around to the east-northeast and an intersection with US 21 and US 21 Bus. ends the state highway.

History

Major intersections

Special routes

Aiken–Kitchings Mill truck route

South Carolina Highway 4 Truck (SC 4 Truck) is a truck route that extends from just east of Aiken to Windsor, via SC 118 and US 78, and then north-northeast to Kitchings Mill, via State Park Road, which it uses to traverse Aiken State Park.

Neeses alternate route

South Carolina Highway 4 Alternate (SC 4 Alt.) was an alternate route that was commissioned around 1940 on Rice Street between SC 4 and a former portion of SC 5 in Neeses. This portion of SC 5 is now part of US 321.

Orangeburg alternate route

South Carolina Highway 4 Alternate (SC 4 Alt.) was an alternate route in the eastern part of Orangeburg. It utilized Whitman Street between former portions of US 21 and SC 4. It was designated between 1935 and 1940, and was decommissioned in 1947. The portion of US 21 is now US 21 Business (US 21 Bus.), and the portion of SC 4 is now Five Chop Road.

See also

References

External links

[http://www.vahighways.com/scannex/route-log/sc004.htm SC 4 at Virginia Highways' South Carolina Highways Annex
Former SC 4 ALT at Virginia Highways' South Carolina Highways Annex

004
Transportation in Aiken County, South Carolina
Transportation in Orangeburg County, South Carolina